The Changan Ford International Curling Elite (known formally as the Qinghai Curling Elite, Qinghai International and originally as the Qinghai China International) is an annual bonspiel, or curling tournament, held in Xining, Qinghai, China. It has been a part of both the Men's and Women's World Curling Tour since 2016. The tournament is held in a round robin format. Over the three years that the tournament has been held, there has been teams from 15 different countries that have participated: Canada, China, Czech Republic, Estonia, Finland, Germany, Italy, South Korea, Netherlands, Norway, Russia, Scotland, Sweden, Switzerland and United States.

Past Champions

Men

Women

References

World Curling Tour events
Curling competitions in China
Xining